In mathematics, Artin–Schreier theory is a branch of Galois theory, specifically a positive characteristic analogue of Kummer theory, for Galois extensions of degree equal to the characteristic p.   introduced Artin–Schreier theory for extensions of prime degree p, and  generalized it to extensions of prime power degree pn.

If K is a field of characteristic p, a prime number, any polynomial of the form

When  for all , this polynomial is irreducible in K[X], and its splitting field over K is a cyclic extension of K of degree p.

Conversely, any Galois extension of K of degree p  equal to the characteristic of K is the splitting field of an Artin–Schreier polynomial. This can be proved using additive counterparts of the methods involved in Kummer theory, such as Hilbert's theorem 90 and additive Galois cohomology.  These extensions are called Artin–Schreier extensions. 

Artin–Schreier extensions play a role in the theory of solvability by radicals, in characteristic p, representing one of the possible classes of extensions in a solvable chain.

They also play a part in the theory of abelian varieties and their isogenies. In characteristic p, an isogeny of degree p of abelian varieties must, for their function fields, give either an Artin–Schreier extension or a purely inseparable extension.

Artin–Schreier–Witt extensions

There is an analogue of Artin–Schreier theory which describes cyclic extensions in characteristic p of p-power degree (not just degree p itself), using 

References

  Section VI.6 
  Section VI.1
 

Galois theory